Iana Alanovna Sotieva (born 26 June 2002) is a Russian weightlifter. She won the bronze medal in the women's 76kg event at the 2021 World Weightlifting Championships held in Tashkent, Uzbekistan. She also won the silver medal in this event at the 2021 European Weightlifting Championships held in Moscow, Russia.

In 2021, she also won the gold medal in her event at the Junior World Weightlifting Championships held in Tashkent, Uzbekistan.

Achievements

References

External links 
 

Living people
2002 births
Place of birth missing (living people)
Russian female weightlifters
European Weightlifting Championships medalists
World Weightlifting Championships medalists
21st-century Russian women